Seon-ok, also spelled Sun-ok or Son-ok, is a Korean feminine given name. Its meaning differs based on the hanja used to write each syllable of the name. There are 41 hanja with the reading "seon" and five hanja with the reading "ok" on the South Korean government's official list of hanja which may be registered for use in given names.

People with this name include:
Jeon Seon-ok (born 1951), South Korean speed skater
Gong Sun-ok (born 1963), South Korean writer
Kim Sun-ok (bobsledder) (born 1980), South Korean bobsledder
Lee Seon-ok (born 1981), South Korean field hockey player
Hong Son-ok (born 1985), North Korean politician, Vice-Chairperson of the Supreme People's Assembly

See also
List of Korean given names

References

Korean feminine given names